"She Knows" is a song by American rapper J. Cole, released on October 29, 2013 as the fourth single from his second studio album, Born Sinner. The song samples "Bad Things" by Cults, and was produced by J. Cole.

Background
The song is produced by J. Cole himself and samples Cults "Bad Things". This song narrates Cole's infidelities and knowing that his girlfriend has possible knowledge of his infidelities even though he wants to quit.

Music video
On February 14, 2014, the accompanying video for "She Knows" was released on Cole's Vevo channel. The video featured actor Harold Perrineau, actress Rochelle Aytes, Ian Martin, and J. Cole himself.
The video follows a boy who steals money from a drawer at home. He bunks off school with his friend and the two sneak into a private skate park. Eventually a police officer sees them and the two just barely manage to escape. The boy returns home and to his shock, sees his mother cheating with another man. The boy runs out of the house and his friend chases him to console him.

Charts

Weekly charts

Year-end charts

Certifications

References

2013 singles
J. Cole songs
Songs written by J. Cole
Song recordings produced by J. Cole
Roc Nation singles
Columbia Records singles
2013 songs